The Mongolian Natural History Museum is a repository and research institution located in Ulaanbaatar, Mongolia. The museum was previously known as the Mongolian National Museum or State Central Museum.

The museum includes Departments of Geology, Geography, Flora and Fauna, Paleontology, and Anthropology encompassing the natural history of Mongolia. The museum's holdings include more than 6000 specimens, 45% of which were on permanent public display.

The museum is particularly well known for its dinosaur and other paleontological exhibits, among which the most notable are a nearly complete skeleton of a late Cretaceous Tarbosaurus tyrannosaurid and broadly contemporaneous nests of  Protoceratops eggs.

The old museum building was demolished in 2019 and the museum moved to the site of the Central Museum of Dinosaurs of Mongolia, with which it had been merged.

History

The Museum was established in 1924 as the National Museum. In 1940-1941 the museum became known as the Rural Research Museum''' and in 1956 as the State Central Museum''. The museum received its current designation after the 1991 democratic revolution.

The previous building was erected in 1953, and was deemed to be highly susceptible to natural disasters such as earthquakes in a study made in 2013. It was scheduled to be replaced by a new building, with budgeting planned to start in 2014. The demolition process started despite public anger early in December 2019. The structure was demolished in the night around 2a.m. on 7 December 2019.

Name
The museum was previously known as the Mongolian National Museum or State Central Museum. This change in name often led to confusion with Ulaanbaatar's other preeminent museum, the National Museum of Mongolia. Although the two museums are located quite close to one another, they contain very different exhibits. The Mongolian National Museum focuses on the archaeology and history of Mongolia, while the Mongolian Natural History Museum is concerned primarily with the flora, fauna, geology and natural history of the country.

References
Танилцуулга

External links

Official site 

Museums in Mongolia
Buildings and structures in Ulaanbaatar
Natural history museums
Museums established in 1924
1924 establishments in Mongolia
Demolished buildings and structures in Mongolia
Buildings and structures demolished in 2019